Bravado is the debut EP by Australian electronic band Miami Horror. Released on 14 November 2008 by Virgin Records, it was produced solely by member Benjamin Plant, as the band had only consisted of him at the time. The track "Don't Be On with Her" received a music video, released on 11 November 2008. "Make You Mine" features guest vocals from Alan Palomo, frontman of the band Neon Indian, who would later collaborate with Miami Horror again on Illumination. 

Additionally, a five-track remix EP titled Bravado Remixes was later digitally released on 21 July 2009.

Track listing

Bravado Remixes

Charts

References

2008 debut EPs
Miami Horror albums
Synth-pop EPs
Virgin Records EPs